George A. Lovejoy (May 24, 1931 – February 5, 2015) was an American politician and businessman.

Early life 
Born in Portland, Oregon, Lovejoy graduated from Spaulding High School in Rochester, New Hampshire.

Career 
Lovejoy served as a cook in the United States Navy during the Korean War and remained in the United States Navy Reserve for six years. Outside of politics, Lovejoy worked in real estate business in Rochester. During the 1970s, Lovejoy served as director of the New Hampshire Office of Comprehensive Planning under Governor Meldrim Thomson Jr. From 1992 to 1996, he served as a member of the New Hampshire Senate as a Republican.

References

1931 births
2015 deaths
People from Rochester, New Hampshire
Politicians from Portland, Oregon
Military personnel from Portland, Oregon
Businesspeople from New Hampshire
Republican Party New Hampshire state senators
United States Navy personnel of the Korean War
20th-century American businesspeople